The following highways are numbered 364:

Brazil
 BR-364

Canada
 Manitoba Provincial Road 364
 Newfoundland and Labrador Route 364
 Quebec Route 364
 Saskatchewan Highway 364

Japan
 Japan National Route 364

United States
  Arizona State Route 364
  Arkansas Highway 364
  Connecticut Route 364
  Georgia State Route 364 (former)
  Indiana State Road 364
  Louisiana Highway 364 (former)
  Maryland Route 364
  Mississippi Highway 364
  Missouri Route 364
  New York State Route 364
  Ohio State Route 364
  Oklahoma State Highway 364 (Creek Turnpike)
  Puerto Rico Highway 364
  Tennessee State Route 364
 Texas:
  Texas State Highway 364
  Texas State Highway Spur 364
  Virginia State Route 364